The Independent Bloc (abbreviated NB/НБ) is a centrist and conservative political party in Bosnia and Herzegovina. Its current leader is Senad Šepić.

History
The Independent Bloc was founded in 2017 after three SDA members of the House of Representatives, Senad Šepić, Sadik Ahmetović and Salko Sokolović, received warnings from SDA's president Bakir Izetbegović that they will be removed from the party because they voted against increasing excise taxes for petroleum and petroleum products. Not willing to vote on the excise taxes SDA removed Šepić and gave a "penalty card" to the other two. Not long after all of them left the party and formed the delegates club of the Independent Bloc which would soon after become a separate political party.

Elections

Parliamentary elections

Presidency elections

See also
Fuad Kasumović, one of the NB (co-)founders and its former member

References

2017 establishments in Bosnia and Herzegovina
Political parties established in 2017
Conservative parties in Bosnia and Herzegovina
Bosniak political parties in Bosnia and Herzegovina